Sempron has been the marketing name used by AMD for several different budget desktop CPUs, using several different technologies and CPU socket formats. The Sempron replaced the AMD Duron processor and competed against Intel's Celeron series of processors. AMD coined the name from the Latin semper, which means "always", to suggest the Sempron is suitable for "daily use, practical, and part of everyday life". The last Semprons were launched in April 2014. The brand was retired with the launch of the AMD A-Series APUs.

History and features 
The first Sempron CPUs were based on the Athlon XP architecture using the Thoroughbred or Thorton core.  These models were equipped with the Socket A interface, 256 KiB L2 cache and 166 MHz Front side bus (FSB 333). Thoroughbred cores natively had 256 KiB L2 cache, but Thortons had 512 KiB L2 cache, half of which was disabled and could sometimes be reactivated with a slight physical modification to the chip. Later, AMD introduced the Sempron 3000+ CPU, based on the Barton core with 512 KiB L2 cache. From a hardware and user standpoint, the Socket A Sempron CPUs were essentially identical to Athlon XP desktop CPUs with a new brand name.  AMD has ceased production of all Socket A Sempron CPUs.

The second generation (Paris/Palermo core) was based on the architecture of the Socket 754 Athlon 64. Some differences from Athlon 64 processors include a reduced cache size (either 128 or 256 KiB L2), and the absence of AMD64 support in earlier models.  Apart from these differences, the Socket 754 Sempron CPUs share most features with the more powerful Athlon 64, including an integrated (on-die) memory controller, the HyperTransport link, and AMD's "NX bit" feature.

In the second half of 2005, AMD added 64-bit support (AMD64) to the Sempron line. Some journalists (but not AMD) often refer to this revision of chips as "Sempron 64" to distinguish it from the previous revision. AMD's intent in releasing 64-bit entry-level processors was to extend the market for 64-bit processors, which at the time of Sempron 64's first release, was a niche market.

In 2006, AMD announced the Socket AM2 and Socket S1 line of Sempron processors. These are functionally equivalent to the previous generation, except they have a dual-channel DDR2 SDRAM memory controller which replaces the single-channel DDR SDRAM version. The TDP of the standard version remains at 62 W (watts), while the new "Energy Efficient Small Form Factor" version has a reduced 35 W TDP. The Socket AM2 version also does not require a minimum voltage of 1.1 volts to operate, whereas all socket 754 Semprons with Cool'n'Quiet did. In 2006, AMD was selling both Socket 754 and Socket AM2 Sempron CPUs concurrently. In the middle of 2007 AMD appears to have dropped the 754 line and is shipping AM2 and S1 Semprons.

Models for Socket A (Socket 462)

Thoroughbred B/Thorton (130 nm) 
 L1-Cache: 64 + 64 KiB (Data + Instructions)
 L2-Cache: 256 KiB, full speed
 MMX, 3DNow!, SSE
 Socket A (EV6)
 Front side bus: 166 MHz (FSB 333)
 VCore: 1.6 V
 First release: July 28, 2004
 Clockrate: 1500 MHz – 2000 MHz (2200+ to 2800+)

Barton (130 nm) 
 L1-Cache: 64 + 64 KiB (Data + Instructions)
 L2-Cache: 512 KiB, full speed
 MMX, 3DNow!, SSE
 Socket A (EV6)
 Front side bus: 166 MHz – 200 MHz (FSB 333 – 400)
 VCore: 1.6 – 1.65 V
 First release: September 17, 2004
 Clockrate: 2000–2200 MHz (Sempron 3000+, Sempron 3300+)

Models for Socket 754

Paris (130 nm SOI) 
 L1-Cache: 64 + 64 KiB (Data + Instructions)
 L2-Cache: 256 KiB, full speed
 MMX, 3DNow!, SSE, SSE2
 Enhanced Virus Protection (NX bit)
 Integrated 72-bit (Single channel, ECC capable) DDR memory controller
 Socket 754, 800 MHz HyperTransport
 VCore: 1.4 V
 First release: July 28, 2004
 Clockrate: 1800 MHz (3100+)
 Stepping: CG (Part No.: *AX)

Palermo (90 nm SOI) 
 Early models (stepping D0) are downlabeled "Oakville" mobile Athlon64
 L1-Cache: 64 + 64 KiB (Data + Instructions)
 L2-Cache: 128/256 KiB, full speed
 MMX, 3DNow!, SSE, SSE2
 SSE3 support on E3 and E6 steppings
 AMD64 on E6 stepping
 Cool'n'Quiet (Sempron 3000+ and higher)
 Enhanced Virus Protection (NX bit)
 Integrated 72-bit (Single channel, ECC capable) DDR memory controller
 Socket 754, 800 MHz HyperTransport
 VCore: 1.4 V
 First release: February 2005
 Clockrate: 1400–2000 MHz
128 KiB L2-Cache (Sempron 2600+, 3000+, 3300+)
256 KiB L2-Cache (Sempron 2500+, 2800+, 3100+, 3400+)
 Steppings: D0 (Part No.: *BA), E3 (Part No.: *BO), E6 (Part No.: *BX)

Models for Socket 939

Palermo (90 nm SOI) 
 L1-Cache: 64 + 64 KiB (Data + Instructions)
 L2-Cache: 128/256 KiB, full speed
 MMX, 3DNow!, SSE, SSE2, SSE3, AMD64 (E6 Steppings Only), Cool'n'Quiet, NX bit
 Integrated 144-bit (Dual channel, ECC capable) DDR memory controller
 Socket 939, 800 MHz HyperTransport
 VCore: 1.35/1.4 V
 First release: October 2005
 Clockrate: 1800–2000 MHz
128 KiB L2-Cache (Sempron 3000+, 3400+)
256 KiB L2-Cache (Sempron 3200+, 3500+)
 Steppings: E3 (Part No.: *BP), E6 (Part No.: *BW)

Models for Socket AM2

Manila (90 nm SOI) 

 L1-Cache: 64 + 64 KiB (Data + Instructions)
 L2-Cache: 128/256 KiB, full speed
 MMX, Extended 3DNow!, SSE, SSE2, SSE3, AMD64, Cool'n'Quiet, NX bit
 Integrated 128-bit (Dual channel) DDR2 memory controller
 Socket AM2, 800 MHz HyperTransport
 VCore: 1.25/1.35/1.40 V (1.20/1.25 V for Energy Efficient SFF version)
 First release: May 23, 2006
 Clockrate: 1600–2200 MHz
128 KiB L2-Cache (Sempron 2800+, 3200+, 3500+)
256 KiB L2-Cache (Sempron 3000+, 3400+, 3600+, 3800+)
 Stepping: F2 (Part No.: *CN, *CW)

Sparta (65 nm SOI) 
 L1-Cache: 64 + 64 KiB (Data + Instructions)
 L2-Cache: 256/512 KiB, full speed
 MMX, Extended 3DNow!, SSE, SSE2, SSE3, AMD64, Cool'n'Quiet, NX bit
 Integrated 128-bit (Dual channel) DDR2 memory controller
 Socket AM2, 800 MHz HyperTransport
 VCore: 1.20/1.40 V
 First release: August 20, 2007
 Clockrate: 1900–2300 MHz
256 KiB L2-Cache (Sempron LE-1100, LE-1150)
512 KiB L2-Cache (Sempron LE-1200, LE-1250, LE-1300)
 Stepping: G1 (Part No.: *DE), G2 (Part No.: *DP)

Brisbane (65 nm SOI)

Models for Socket AM3

Sargas (45 nm SOI) 
 Chip harvests from Regor with one core disabled
 Core Speed (MHz) – 2600–2900
 Max Temps (C):  	63
 VCore:       1.35 V
 TDP: 	45 W
 L1 Cache Size (KB) 	128
 L2 Cache Size (KB) 	1024
 CPU Arch : 1 CPU – 1 Cores – 1 Threads
 CPU EXT : MMX(+) 3DNow!(+) SSE SSE2 SSE3 SSE4A x86-64 AMD-V, Cool'n'Quiet, NX bit
 Integrated 128-bit (Dual Channel) DDR2 + DDR3 Memory Controller
 Socket AM3, 2000 MHz HyperTransport
 Steppings: C2, C3

Models for Socket S1 (638)

Keene (90 nm SOI) 
 L1-Cache: 64 + 64 KiB (Data + Instructions)
 L2-Cache: 256 or 512 KiB, full speed
 MMX, Extended 3DNow!, SSE, SSE2, SSE3, AMD64, Cool'n'Quiet, NX bit
 Integrated 128-bit (Dual channel) DDR2 memory controller
 Socket S1, 800 MHz HyperTransport
 VCore: 0.950-1.25 V
 First release: May 17, 2006
 Clockrate: 1000–2000 MHz
256 KiB L2-Cache (Sempron 2100+, 3400+)
512 KiB L2-Cache (Sempron 3200+, 3500+, 3600+)
 Stepping: F2 (Part No.: *CM)

Sable (65 nm SOI) 
 L1-Cache: 64 + 64 KiB (Data + Instructions)
 L2-Cache: 512 KiB, full speed
 MMX, Extended 3DNow!, SSE, SSE2, SSE3, AMD64, Cool'n'Quiet, NX bit
 Integrated 128-bit (Dual channel) DDR2 memory controller
 Socket S1, 1600 MHz HyperTransport
 VCore: 0.950-1.25 V
 First release: January 8, 2009
 Clockrate: 2000–2100 MHz 25w
512 KiB L2-Cache

Models for ASB1 package (BGA)

Huron (65 nm SOI) 
L1-Cache: 64 + 64 KiB (Data + Instructions)
L2-Cache: 256 KiB, full speed
MMX, Extended 3DNow!, SSE, SSE2, SSE3, AMD64, Cool'n'Quiet, NX bit
Integrated 128-bit (Dual channel) DDR2 memory controller
ASB1 package, 800 MHz HyperTransport
VCore: ?
First release: January 8, 2009
Clockrate: 1000–1500 MHz
256 KiB L2-Cache (Sempron 200U) 1000 MHz TDP 8 W
256 KiB L2-Cache (Sempron 210U) 1500 MHz TDP 15 W
Stepping: ? (Part No.: *DV)

Models for Socket 754 32-bit Semprons

Models for Socket S1 (638) 64-bit Semprons

FM2/FM2+ Semprons
Model 240, 3.3 GHz/2.9 GHz, 1MB cache, 65W
Model 250, 3.6 GHz/3.2 GHz, 1MB cache, 65W, Piledriver microarchitecture, Richland core

Models for Socket AM1

Semprons without Cool'n'Quiet 
AMD has released some Sempron processors without Cool'n'Quiet support. The following table describes those processors lacking Cool'n'Quiet.

See also 
 List of AMD Sempron microprocessors

References

External links 
 AMD K7 Sempron technical specifications
 AMD K8 Sempron technical specifications
 AMD's Desktop Sempron product page
 AMD's Notebook Sempron product page

AMD x86 microprocessors